Volutella is a genus of fungi belonging to the family Nectriaceae.

Species:
 Volutella buxi
 Volutella ciliata
 Volutella gilva
 Volutella piriformis
 Volutella roseola

References

Nectriaceae
Taxa named by Elias Magnus Fries
Sordariomycetes genera